The Archdeacon of Moray was the only archdeacon in the Diocese of Moray, acting as a deputy of the Bishop of Moray. The archdeacon held the parish churches of Forres and Edinkillie as a prebends since 1207. The following is a list of known historical archdeacons:

List of archdeacons of Moray
 Thomas, fl. 1179 x 1188
 Robert, fl. 1197 x 1206
 Gilbert de Moravia, 1206 x 1208-1222 x 1224
 Hugh, x 1225-1227 x
 Ranulf, x 1228-1232 x
 William, 1235-1249 x
 Archibald Herok, x 1258-1275
 John, fl. 1281 x 1299
 Stephen de Donydouer, x 1316-1317
 Adam Penny, fl. 1327
 Alexander Bur, 1350-1362
 William de Forres, 1363-1370
 Stephen, fl. 1371
 Duncan Petit, x 1385-1385 x 1393
 Hugh Dickson de Dalmahoy, 1393-1394 x
 James de Dunbar, 1397-1408
 Adam de Nairn, 1408-1409x1414
 William de Camera, 1408-x 1430
 John de Forbes, x 1430
 1430-1435
 William de Dunbar, 1430-1435
 Nicholas de Atholl,  1430-1435
 Robert de Crannach, 1430-1433
 Robert Scrymgeour, 1435
 Henry Hervy, 1435-1438 x 1440
 John de Atholl, 1435-1437
 Duncan de Lichton, 1437
 David Ogilvie, 1438 x 1440-1443 x 1444
 Robert de Tulloch, 1443
 Thomas Spens, 1444-1447 x 1448
 Patrick Fraser, 1445-1448 x 1462
 Archibald Whitelaw, 1462 x 1463-1466 x 1467
 Thomas Cockburn, 1462
 Archibald Knowles, 1467-1473 x 1475
 Robert de Forrest, 1467-1467 x 1468
 Alexander de Meldrum, 1467-1467 x 1468
 Andrew of Forfar, 1468
 John Edwardi (?Edwardson), 1468
 John Garden, 1475-1479
 John Calder, 1476
 John Ruch, 1476
 James Allardice, 1476-1506 x x1507
 Alexander Crichton, x 1508
 John Estoun, 1508
 Patrick Paniter, 1509-1513
 Thomas Nudry, 1510-1526 x 1527
 James Douglas, 1527-1533
 Alexander Hervy, 1529
 Sixtus Zuchellus, 1529-1530
 John Bellenden, 1533-1538
 Archibald Dunbar, 1539-1551 x 1565
 John Lesley, 1565-1567
 Gavin Dunbar, 1574-1613
 Patrick Tulloch, 1613-1638

Notes

Bibliography
 Watt, D.E.R., Fasti Ecclesiae Scoticanae Medii Aevi ad annum 1638, 2nd Draft, (St Andrews, 1969), pp. 237–42

See also
 Bishop of Moray

Moray
Religion in Highland (council area)
History of the Scottish Highlands
Religion in Moray
History of Moray
People associated with Highland (council area)
People associated with Moray